Miss Marianas is the national Beauty pageant in Northern Marianas.

History
In 2003, the NMBPA sent the winner to Miss World. The runner-up of Miss Marianas has traditionally competed at the Miss International pageant.

In 2015, Miss Marianas will return in new concept from Stellar Marianas Group and will select the winners in 2015 early.

In 2015, Jian Joyner, a sophomore majoring in liberal arts at Northern Marianas College and a tutor at Salty Saipan Corporation was crowned as Miss Marianas during the pageant at the Hyatt's SandCastle on Thursday night where she also won the Stellar Star Best in National Costume and Best in Swimsuit awards. According to Marianas Variety, part of Joyner's prize is an all-expense-paid trip to compete in the Miss International 2015 Pageant from Delta Air Lines and the Marianas Visitors Authority.

Titleholders

Big Four pageants

Miss Marianas International

Traditionally second title of Miss Marianas Universe will be crowning as Miss Marianas International to compete at Miss International pageant. Sometimes the winner of Miss Marianas Universe competed at the pageant.

Miss Marianas Universe

Miss Marianas Earth

Miss Marianas World

Notes
In 1981, the newly crowned queen, Juanita Masga Mendiola relinquished her title to further education. Her successor is unknown as of this time.
In 1989, newly crowned queen Soreen Villanueva was dethroned for reasons undisclosed, and eventually was succeeded by Teresa Wamar who competed at the Miss International Pageant.
For the competing years 2000, 2006, 2007, 2009–2014, and 2017 no pageant was held.
In 2003, Kimberly Castro Reyes was crowned Miss Marianas Universe of that year. Eventually however, she was unable to compete at the national competition in Panama City, Panama that year due to a miscommunication between the pageant's then-organization The Northern Marianas Beauty Pageant Association (NMBPA) and Miss Universe. Outrage and protest had resulted from this by the community and the winning contestant's family and friends. Instead, she was eventually sent to compete at Miss World 2003 in Sanya, the People's Republic of China.
In 2004, Tracy Del Rosario was crowned Miss Marianas World for that year. It was the only time since the U.S. territory's pageant participation, that a winner of the pageant would be crowned a different title other than Miss Marianas Universe. The year before, crowned Miss Marianas Universe-winner Reyes had been expected to compete at its national pageant but was instead sent to Miss World. This was the last year the NMBPA held the pageant license for its competing territory. They disbanded quickly after the year's pageant.
Since 2005, a new non-profit pageant and talent organization Stellar Marianas currently directs and holds the license to the Miss Marianas Universe.
Sorene Maratita, Miss Marianas Universe 2008, did not compete in Miss Universe 2008 due to lack of sponsorship and funding. She represented the Marianas in Miss International.

References

Beauty pageants in the Northern Mariana Islands
American awards
Northern Marianas